Hulog Ng Langit is the seventh studio album by Filipino singer Donna Cruz, released in the Philippines in 1999 by Viva Records. It was released as Cruz's final album under her contract with Viva Entertainment. Cruz did not record another album until Now and Forever in 2016.

Background and promotion 
After her marriage to ophthalmologist Potenciano Larrazabal III in 1998, Cruz began recording new material for her upcoming album. Having unfulfilled her duties under her then-current recording contract with Viva Entertainment Group, Cruz was obliged to finish her contract by recording a studio album. In 1999, Cruz handpicked longtime collaborator and producer Vehnee Saturno to write "Hulog Ng Langit" which was chosen as the lead single. As she was pregnant with her first child back then, Cruz also recorded several cover songs she wanted to be part of the album which included "Someone's Waiting for You" from The Rescuers, John Denver's "For Baby," Dusty Springfield's "I Only Want to Be with You", Petula Clark's "You and I" and "I Have Dreamed" which was originally performed by Julie Andrews.

Cruz embarked on a promotional tour for the album in 2000 after she gave birth to her daughter, Isabella Adriana. Two singles were released from the album, the Vehnee Saturno-penned title track, and "Ikaw Pala 'Yon" which was released in early 2000, shortly after Cruz gave birth. The album was eventually certified platinum.

Track listing

References 

1999 albums
Donna Cruz albums